Michael Foley (1844 – 21 November 1904) was a New Zealand cricketer. He played first-class cricket for Taranaki and Wellington between 1876 and 1883.

See also
 List of Taranaki representative cricketers
 List of Wellington representative cricketers

References

External links
 

1844 births
1904 deaths
New Zealand cricketers
Taranaki cricketers
Wellington cricketers
Cricketers from Auckland